Rockport is a city in Ohio Township and the county seat of Spencer County, Indiana, along the Ohio River. The population was 2,270 at the 2010 census. Once the largest community in Spencer County, the city has recently been surpassed by the town of Santa Claus. At 37°53'1" north, Rockport is also the southernmost city in the state, located slightly south of Evansville, Cannelton, or Mount Vernon (the westernmost city).

History
Lots were first sold in Rockport in 1818. The town received its name from rock outcroppings on the Ohio River.

Three locations in Rockport are listed on the National Register of Historic Places: the Spencer County Courthouse, the Mathias Sharp House, and the Lincoln Pioneer Village.

The Rockport post office has been in operation since 1823.

The AK Steel facility in Rockport is reported by the EPA as the source for 70% of the pollution in the Ohio River, the nation's most polluted waterway.

Geography

Rockport is nestled on the Ohio River across from Owensboro, Kentucky. It is home to the Rockport Generating Station, a coal power plant which is scheduled to close by 2028 due to the pollution it causes. It is connected to Owensboro by the William H. Natcher Bridge via U.S. Route 231.

Demographics

2010 census
As of the census of 2010, there were 2,270 people, 908 households, and 564 families living in the city. The racial makeup of the city was 95.9% White, 1.8% African American, 0.2% Native American, 0.3% Asian, 0.4% from other races, and 1.4% from two or more races. Hispanic or Latino of any race were 2.6% of the population. 
There were 908 households, of which 33.0% had children under the age of 18 living with them, 43.1% were married couples living together, 14.6% had a female householder with no husband present, 4.4% had a male householder with no wife present, and 37.9% were non-families. 33.8% of all households were made up of individuals, and 14.9% had someone living alone who was 65 years of age or older. The average household size was 2.37 and the average family size was 3.05.

The median age in the city was 39.1 years. 25.5% of residents were under the age of 18; 7.8% were between the ages of 18 and 24; 23.9% were from 25 to 44; 25.5% were from 45 to 64; and 17.3% were 65 years of age or older. The gender makeup of the city was 48.5% male and 51.5% female.

2000 census
As of the census of 2000, there were 2,160 people, 891 households, and 571 families living in the city. The racial makeup of the city was 95.83% White, 2.59% African American, 0.37% Native American, 0.32% Asian, 0.19% from other races, and 0.69% from two or more races. Hispanic or Latino of any race were 1.25% of the population.

There were 891 households, out of which 31.4% had children under the age of 18 living with them, 46.2% were married couples living together, 13.5% had a female householder with no husband present, and 35.9% were non-families. 32.5% of all households were made up of individuals, and 18.7% had someone living alone who was 65 years of age or older. The average household size was 2.36 and the average family size was 2.99.

In the city, the population was spread out, with 25.0% under the age of 18, 8.6% from 18 to 24, 27.4% from 25 to 44, 20.9% from 45 to 64, and 18.1% who were 65 years of age or older. The median age was 38 years. For every 100 females, there were 87.7 males. For every 100 females age 18 and over, there were 88.4 males.

The median income for a household in the city was $27,275, and the median income for a family was $37,554. Males had a median income of $30,278 versus $20,263 for females. The per capita income for the city was $14,298. About 10.2% of families and 14.9% of the population were below the poverty line, including 19.4% of those under age 18 and 12.8% of those age 65 or over.

Education
Rockport has a public library, a branch of Spencer County Public Library.

There is one public elementary school, and one private school

Arts and culture
Lincoln Pioneer Village, listed on the National Register of Historic Places, is located in Rockport City Park. Designed by Indiana sculptor George Honig, the first phase of the Village was completed in 1935, with an addition completed the following year. The project was undertaken through grants from the Federal Emergency Relief Administration and Works Progress Administration, both programs of the "New Deal".

Historically accurate replicas of a number of Spencer County cabins and businesses from Abraham Lincoln's time are the main attraction of the Village, giving visitors the opportunity to see what it was like to live in Indiana during Lincoln's formative years. The Village was so well known throughout the United States in its early years that it was chosen as the setting for portions of the 1955 Burt Lancaster film The Kentuckian.

In recent years, the Village was restored by a group of committed volunteers with the help of a grant-in-aid from the state of Indiana, following up on a somewhat less historically accurate but necessary restoration in the 1980s. The most recent restoration returned the site to its original 1930s design, and included the reconstruction of the entrance cabin, the original having been demolished due to extreme deterioration when the first restoration was undertaken.

Notable people

 Parrish Casebier, collegiate & professional basketball player; was raised and attended school in Rockport.
 Florence Henderson, actress, was raised and attended school in Rockport.
 Allen J. Payton (ca. 1861-62 – 1917), farmer and politician
 Thomas G. Pitcher, Union general in the Civil War and was an 1845 graduate of the United States Military Academy later serving as Superintendent from 1866 to 1871.  Born in Rockport, Indiana, later lived in Mount Vernon and is buried in Arlington National Cemetery.
 James C. Veatch, Indiana state legislator and Union general during the Civil War; lived in Rockport at the time of his death.
 Kate Milner Rabb, Indiana journalist and author; lived in Rockport in 1866. Attended High School in Rockport.

See also
 List of cities and towns along the Ohio River

References

External links

 
Cities in Indiana
Communities of Southwestern Indiana
Cities in Spencer County, Indiana
County seats in Indiana
Indiana populated places on the Ohio River
Sundown towns in Indiana